Deborah Ann Harry (born Angela Trimble; July 1, 1945) is an American singer, songwriter and actress, best known as the lead vocalist of the band Blondie. Four of her songs with the band reached  on the US charts between 1979 and 1981.

Born in Miami, Florida, Harry was adopted as an infant and raised in Hawthorne, New Jersey. After attending college, she worked various jobs—as a dancer, a Playboy Bunny and a secretary (including at the BBC in New York)—before her breakthrough in the music industry. Harry co-formed Blondie in 1974 in New York City. The band released its eponymous debut album in 1976, and released a further three albums between then and 1979, including Parallel Lines, which spawned six singles, including "Heart of Glass". Their fifth album, Autoamerican (1980), afforded Harry and the band further attention, spawning such hits as a cover of "The Tide Is High", and "Rapture", the latter of which is considered the first rap song to chart at number one in the United States.

Harry released her debut solo album, KooKoo, in 1981. During a Blondie hiatus, she embarked on an acting career, appearing in lead roles in the neo-noir Union City (1980) and in David Cronenberg's body horror film Videodrome (1983). She released her second solo album, 1986's Rockbird, and starred in John Waters's cult dance film Hairspray (1988). Harry went on to release two more solo albums between then and 1993, after which she returned to film with roles in a John Carpenter-directed segment of the horror film Body Bags (1993), and in the drama Heavy (1995).

Blondie reunited in the late 1990s, releasing No Exit (1999), followed by The Curse of Blondie (2003). Harry continued to appear in independent films throughout the 2000s, including Deuces Wild (2002), My Life Without Me (2003) and Elegy (2008). With Blondie, she released the group's ninth studio album, Panic of Girls, in 2011, followed by Ghosts of Download (2014). The band's eleventh studio album, 2017's Pollinator, charted at number 4 in the United Kingdom.

Life and career

1945–1965: Early life
Harry was born Angela Trimble on July 1, 1945, in Miami, Florida. At the age of three months, she was adopted by Catherine (née Peters) and Richard Harry, gift shop proprietors in Hawthorne, New Jersey, and renamed Deborah Ann Harry. Harry learned of her adoption at four years old. At first she decided against locating her birth parents, but nonetheless located her birth mother, a concert pianist, in the late 1980s, who chose not to establish a relationship with Harry. In her memoir, she recalls being a tomboy, spending much of her childhood playing in the woods adjacent to her home.

Harry attended Hawthorne High School, graduating in 1963. She graduated from Centenary College in Hackettstown, New Jersey, with an Associate of Arts degree in 1965. Before beginning her singing career, she moved to New York City in the late 1960s, and worked there as a secretary at BBC Radio's office for one year. Later, she was a waitress at Max's Kansas City, a go-go dancer in a discothèque in Union City, New Jersey, and a Playboy Bunny.

1966–1975: Early projects; formation of Blondie

In the late 1960s, Harry began her musical career as a backing singer for the folk rock group The Wind in the Willows, which released an eponymous album in 1968 on Capitol Records.

In 1973, Harry joined the Stilettoes with Elda Gentile and Amanda Jones. Shortly thereafter, the band added guitarist Chris Stein, who became her boyfriend. In her memoir, Face It, Harry describes having been raped at knifepoint during a burglary of the home she shared with Stein.

In 1974 Harry and Stein left the Stilletos (along with the band's bassist and drummer) and formed Angel and the Snake with Tish Bellomo and Snooky Bellomo. Shortly thereafter, they changed the name of the band to Blondie, named after the catcall men often directed at Harry after she bleached her hair blonde. The band quickly became regulars at Max's Kansas City and CBGB in New York City.

1976–1980: Global success
With her beauty, daring choice of clothing, and two-tone bleached-blonde hair, Harry quickly became a punk icon.

Their second album, Plastic Letters, garnered some success outside the United States, but their third album, Parallel Lines (1978), was a worldwide hit and catapulted the group to international success. It included the global hit single "Heart of Glass". Riding the crest of disco's domination, the track made  in the US and sold nearly two million copies. It also reached  in the UK and was the second highest-selling single of 1979.
 
In June 1979, Blondie was featured on the cover of Rolling Stone. Harry's persona, combining cool sexuality with streetwise style, became so closely associated with the group's name that many came to believe "Blondie" was the singer's name. The difference between the individual Harry and the band Blondie was emphasized by a "Blondie is a group" button campaign by the band in 1979. The band's success continued with the release of the platinum-selling Eat to the Beat album (UK , US ) in September.

Autoamerican (UK , US ) was released in 1980. Blondie had further  hits with "Call Me" (American Gigolo soundtrack) (US and UK ), "Atomic" (Eat to the Beat album) (UK ), "The Tide Is High" (US and UK ), and "Rapture" (US ).

During this time, both Harry and Stein befriended graffiti artist Fab Five Freddy, who introduced them to the emerging hip-hop scene in the Bronx. Freddy is mentioned in "Rapture" and appears in the video. Through Fab Five Freddy they were also able to connect with Grandmaster Flash who is played by Jean-Michel Basquiat in the video as his label did not allow him to appear.  "Rapture" became the first rap-oriented song to reach  in the US Billboard charts.

Harry was immortalized by Andy Warhol in 1980, who produced a number of artworks of her image from a single photoshoot at the Factory. The artist created a small series of four acrylic and silkscreen ink on canvas portraits of the star in different colors, as well as Polaroids and a small number of rare silver gelatin prints from the shoot. Stein was also present that day to capture Warhol photographing Harry in a series of his own photographs, exhibited in 2013 in London.

Her collaboration and friendship with Warhol continued and she was his first guest on the MTV show Andy Warhol's Fifteen Minutes. The first episode opened with Harry announcing the theme: "Sex, Vegetables, Brothers and Sisters".

Harry said of her relationship with Warhol, "I think the best thing [Andy Warhol] taught me was always to be open to new things, new music, new style, new bands, new technology and just go with it. Never get mired in the past and always accept new things whatever age you are."

1981–1996: Solo work and acting
In 1981, Harry issued a press release to clarify that her name was not "Debbie Blondie" or "Debbie Harry" but rather Deborah Harry, though Harry later described her character in the band as being named "Blondie", as in this quote from the No Exit tour book:

Harry began her solo career with the album KooKoo (1981). The album's cover art was controversial, and many stores refused to stock it. "Backfired", the first single from the album, had a video directed by H.R. Giger (who also created the album's front cover featuring Harry's face with metal skewers through it). "The Jam Was Moving" was lifted as the second single and peaked at No. 82 in the US.

After a year-long hiatus, Blondie regrouped and released their sixth studio album, The Hunter (1982). The album was not as successful as their previous works, and a world tour was cut short due to slow ticket sales. It was around this time that Stein also fell seriously ill with the rare autoimmune disease pemphigus. His illness, along with declining record sales and internal struggles, caused the band to split up.

In June 1982, Harry contributed backing vocals to The Gun Club's second album Miami, being credited as 'D.H. Lawrence Jr' while Chris Stein also produced the record, and is credited as 'bongos' and 'cover photos/design'. The Gun Club's singer Jeffrey Lee Pierce was an ardent fan, emulating Harry's hairstyle and founding the West Coast Blondie Fan Club, before becoming friends with the band in New York.

After Blondie split up in 1982, Harry's solo output slowed down as she cared for ailing partner Chris Stein. She released the single "Rush Rush" in 1983 (produced by Giorgio Moroder and taken from the film Scarface), but it was commercially unsuccessful. The same year, Harry had a leading role in David Cronenberg's body horror film Videodrome (1983), playing the sadomasochistic lover of a television producer who uncovers an underground video output of snuff films. Harry received rave reviews for her performance in the film. Critic Howard Hampton noted in a retrospective that Harry "carries herself with the wry, burned-out, but still titillated instincts of a voyager buying a one-way ticket for the outer limits. A vivid, smallish part can either anchor or undo a risky, conceptually spiky film like David Cronenberg's viscerally deranged phantasia: Harry's presence grounds it in acute, self-aware reality."

A new single, "Feel The Spin" (taken from the film Krush Groove), was released as a limited 12" single in 1985, but it was unsuccessful. The single "French Kissin' in the USA" gave Harry her only UK solo top 10 hit and became a moderate US hit. Other singles released from the album were "Free to Fall" and "In Love with Love", with the latter completely re-recorded in London with hit British producers Stock Aitken Waterman (SAW). The track hit  on the US Dance Charts and was released with several remixes. Harry also recorded another track with SAW during the same sessions, "Mind Over Matter", which was never officially released.

In 1987, Harry starred opposite Alec Baldwin in the comedy mystery film Forever, Lulu, playing the title character.

"Liar, Liar" was recorded by Harry for the soundtrack album Married to the Mob in 1988 and was produced by Mike Chapman. It was their first collaboration since the 1982 Blondie album The Hunter. The same year, Harry starred as Velma Von Tussle in John Waters's satirical dance film Hairspray.

Her next solo venture was the album Def, Dumb and Blonde in 1989. At this point Harry reverted from "Debbie" to "Deborah" as her professional name. The first single "I Want That Man" was a hit in Europe and Australia and on the US Modern Rock Charts. She followed this up with the ballad "Brite Side" and the club hit "Sweet and Low". "Maybe for Sure", a reworked version of "Angel's Song" she'd recorded for the Rock and Rule animated film, was the fourth single released from the album in June 1990 to coincide with a UK tour (her second in six months). The track "Kiss It Better" was also a Top 15 Modern Rock single in the US.

Harry also appeared in film during this time, with a supporting part in Tales from the Darkside: The Movie (1990). From 1989 to 1991, Harry toured extensively across the world with former Blondie guitarist Chris Stein, Underworld's Karl Hyde, and future Blondie bassist Leigh Foxx. In July 1991 she played Wembley Stadium, supporting INXS. In 1991, Chrysalis released a new "best of" compilation in Europe entitled The Complete Picture: The Very Best of Deborah Harry and Blondie, containing hits with Blondie as well as her solo hits. The collection reached  in the UK album chart and earned a gold disc. The album also included her duet with Iggy Pop of the Cole Porter song "Well, Did You Evah!" from the 1990 Red Hot + Blue AIDS charity album.

In 1992, Harry collaborated with German post-punk band Die Haut on the track "Don't Cross My Mind" and released the song "Prelude to a Kiss" on the soundtrack to the film of the same name. She also released a cover of "Summertime Blues" from the soundtrack to the film That Night in Australia. Her fourth solo album, Debravation, was released in July 1993. The album peaked at #24 in the UK, but was less successful in the US. This was followed by "Strike Me Pink" in September. Controversy surrounded the latter track's promotional video, which featured a man drowning in a water tank, resulting in its being banned. US editions of the album feature two additional tracks recorded with prerecorded music by R.E.M.: "Tear Drops" and a cover of Skeeter Davis's 1961 hit "My Last Date (with You)". Also in 1993, Harry had a supporting role in a John Carpenter-directed segment of the anthology horror film Body Bags.

In November 1993, Harry toured the UK with Stein, guitarist Peter Min, bassist Greta Brinkman, and drummer James Murphy. The set list of the Debravation Tour featured an offbeat selection of Harry material including the previously unreleased track "Close Your Eyes" (from 1989) and "Ordinary Bummer" (from the Stein-produced Iggy Pop album Zombie Birdhouse, a track that, under the moniker Adolph's Dog, Blondie covered in 1997). Tentative plans to record these shows and release them as a live double CD never came to fruition. However, covers of the Rolling Stones' "Wild Horses" and David Oliver's "Love TKO" exist as bootlegs. In early 1994, Harry took the Debravation tour to the US. In the UK, Harry's long tenure with Chrysalis Records also came to an end after Debravation lackluster sales, but the label released all of Blondie's albums and Harry's KooKoo album (for the first time on CD) as remastered editions with bonus tracks.

In the mid 1990s, Harry worked as a guest vocalist on several projects: She joined the avant-garde jazz ensemble the Jazz Passengers in 1994, appearing on their album In Love (1994). Harry also reunited with Blondie keyboardist Jimmy Destri for a cover of Otis Blackwell's "Don't Be Cruel" for the 1995 album Brace Yourself! A Tribute to Otis Blackwell. During this period, she also recorded a duet with actor Robert Jacks titled "Der Einziger Weg (The Only Way)", a theme for the horror film Texas Chainsaw Massacre: The Next Generation (1994), which was recorded in German and in English. Harry also served as a vocalist in the Talking Heads' side project the Heads' 1996 release No Talking, Just Head, followed by the Jazz Passengers' Individually Twisted (1997). The same year, she collaborated with Jazz Passengers' Bill Ware in his side project Groove Thing, singing lead vocals on the club hit "Command and Obey". Another Jazz Passengers collaboration, "The City in the Sea", appeared on the Edgar Allan Poe tribute album Closed on Account of Rabies (1997).

In film, Harry co-starred with Pruitt Taylor Vince and Liv Tyler in James Mangold's directorial debut Heavy (1995), playing a misanthropic waitress at an upstate New York restaurant. The following year, she filmed Mangold's Cop Land (1997), a neo-noir thriller in which she portrayed a bartender.

1997–2007: Blondie reformation and solo output

In 1997, Blondie began working together again for the first time in 15 years. The four original members (Harry, Stein, Clem Burke and Jimmy Destri) began sessions for what would become Blondie's seventh studio album, No Exit (1999). "Maria" also reached  in 14 countries, the top 10 on the US Dance Charts, and Top 20 on the US Adult Top 40 Charts.

Harry appears on the 2001 Bill Ware album Vibes 4 singing the track "Me and You" as well as on former Police guitarist Andy Summers's album Peggy's Blue Skylight on the track "Weird Nightmare". A techno cover of Stan Jones' "Ghost Riders in the Sky" was featured on the soundtrack to the 1998 film Three Businessmen, and was available on her website to download. Harry sings on two tracks on Andrea Griminelli's Cinema Italiano project: "You'll Come to Me" (inspired by Amarcords main theme) and "When Love Comes By" (from Il Postino), as well as on a tribute album reinterpreting the music of Harold Arlen, on which she sings the title track "Stormy Weather". In May 2002, she accompanied the Jazz Passengers and the BBC Concert Orchestra in a performance of her jazz material at the Barbican Centre in London. In 2003, she was featured vocalist on the song "Uncontrollable Love" by DJ duo Blow-Up. She also sang on the version of "Waltzing Matilda" recorded by Dan Zanes and Friends, released on the 2003 album House Party. The same year, Blondie released the album The Curse of Blondie (2003).

In 2006, Harry started work in New York City on her fifth solo album, Necessary Evil (released in 2007). Working with production duo Super Buddha (who produced the remix of Blondie's "In the Flesh" for the 2005 Sound and Vision compilation), the first music to surface in was a hip-hop track titled "Dirty and Deep" in which she spoke out against rapper Lil' Kim's incarceration. Throughout 2006, a number of new tracks surfaced on Harry's Myspace page, including "Charm Alarm", "Deep End", "Love with a Vengeance", "School for Scandal", and "Necessary Evil", as well as duets she recorded with Miss Guy (of Toilet Böys fame), "God Save New York" and "New York Groove". A streaming version of the lead single, "Two Times Blue", was added to Harry's Myspace page in May 2007. On June 6, 2007, a downloadable version was released via her official website.

In 2007, Harry delineated the different personae (Blondie the band, her role in the band, and Deborah Harry the singer) to an interviewer who asked why she played only solo music on the 2007 True Colors World Tour with Cyndi Lauper: "I've put together a new trio with no Blondie members in it. I really want to make a clear definition between Debbie's solo projects and Blondie, and I hope that the audience can appreciate that and also appreciate this other material."

Harry's fifth solo album, Necessary Evil (2007), was released after she completed the True Colors World Tour. Harry performed "Two Times Blue" on various talk shows to promote the album. She also started a 22-date US tour on November 8, lasting until December 9, playing small venues and clubs across the country. On January 18, 2008, an official music video for "If I Had You" was released.

2008–present: Further musical endeavors
Harry contributed to Fall Out Boy's 2008 album Folie à Deux, singing on the chorus of the album's closer "West Coast Smoker". In 2010, Harry began a series recordings (featuring solo songs and duets with Nick Cave and others) for The Jeffrey Lee Pierce Sessions Project. Blondie released their ninth studio album, Panic of Girls, in July 2011.

In 2014, Harry made a guest appearance with Arcade Fire at the Coachella Valley Music and Arts Festival, The following month, Blondie released their tenth studio album Ghosts of Download (2014). In 2015, Blondie members Debbie Harry and Chris Stein made a guest appearance alongside The Gregory Brothers in an episode of Songify the News, and they collaborated again to parody the United States presidential election debates, 2016. In March 2015, Harry held a residency of several weeks at the Café Carlyle in New York.

In October 2019, Harry released a memoir, Face It, through Dey Street Books. In 2020, Harry cameoed on the third episode of the romantic comedy web television series High Fidelity. In 2023, Rolling Stone ranked Harry at number 168 on its list of the 200 Greatest Singers of All Time.

Personal life
Harry was in a relationship with the Blondie guitarist Chris Stein. The pair split up in 1987, but remained friends. In 2011, Harry said that she and Stein were both drug users during their relationship, and that they had spent time in a rehabilitation clinic and no longer used drugs. Harry is godmother to Stein's two daughters.

In 2014, Harry revealed that she had had several relationships with women in her youth.

In her 2019 memoir, Face It: A Memoir, Harry describes having been raped at knifepoint during a burglary of the home she shared with Stein. She also wrote that during the early 1970s, the serial killer Ted Bundy lured her into his car in New York City, but she escaped. Harry's description of the white vehicle stripped on the inside and missing the passenger door handle matched the 1968 VW Bundy was driving, but authorities believed him to be in Florida at the time. Ann Rule, an author of the Bundy biography The Stranger Beside Me, commented that erroneous claims of Bundy abductions are fairly common.

As of 2019, Harry lives part-time in New York City and part-time in Monmouth County, New Jersey, together with her four dogs.

Philanthropy
 
In a 2011 interview, Harry said that "After witnessing Elton John and his tireless efforts against HIV/AIDS", she had been inspired to make philanthropy her top priority. She said, "These things are important to my life now. I have the privilege of being able to get involved, so I do. I applaud people like Elton John, who have used their position to do so much good." Some of Harry's preferred charities include those devoted to fighting cancer and endometriosis.

DiscographyStudio albums KooKoo (1981)
 Rockbird (1986)
 Def, Dumb & Blonde (1989)
 Debravation (1993)
 Necessary Evil (2007)Compilations and other albums'''
 Once More into the Bleach (1988, Debbie Harry and Blondie)
 The Complete Picture: The Very Best of Deborah Harry and Blondie (1991, Deborah Harry and Blondie)
 Deborah Harry Collection (1998)
 Most of All: The Best of Deborah Harry (1999)

Filmography

Bibliography
 Making Tracks: The Rise of Blondie (1982) by Debbie Harry, Chris Stein and Victor Bockris ISBN-10: /-13: 
 Foreword to Debbie Harry and Blondie: Picture This (2011)
 Face It'' (2019) by Debbie Harry, HarperCollins ISBN-10: /-13:

References

Sources

External links

 
 
 
 

Debbie Harry
1945 births
Living people
20th-century American actresses
20th-century American women singers
21st-century American actresses
21st-century American women singers
Actresses from Miami
Actresses from New Jersey
Actresses from New York City
American adoptees
American women pop singers
American pop rock singers
American women rock singers
American women singer-songwriters
American film actresses
American new wave musicians
American people of Scottish descent
American punk rock singers
American rock songwriters
American television actresses
American video game actresses
American voice actresses
American women in electronic music
Bisexual women
Blondie (band) members
Centenary University alumni
Chrysalis Records artists
Women new wave singers
Women punk rock singers
Geffen Records artists
Bisexual musicians
Musicians from Miami
People from Hackettstown, New Jersey
People from Hawthorne, New Jersey
Singer-songwriters from Florida
Singer-songwriters from New Jersey
Singers from New York City
Sire Records artists
The Jazz Passengers members
20th-century American singers
21st-century American singers
Singer-songwriters from New York (state)
Women in punk